Thion is a department or commune of Gnagna Province in northern Burkina Faso. Its capital lies at the town of Thion.

Towns and villages

 Balamba
 Bangaye
 Bangayéni
 Banogo
 Bogoumissi
 Bossongri
 Diaka
 Dimkoura
 Dioro
 Dioro-Folgou
 Doyana
 Folbombouga
 Folbongou
 Folgou
 Gnindi
 Harga
 Koulbila
 Lalguin
 Laranga
 Lelcom
 Monlori
 Morèm
 Nawèga
 Sékoussi
 Siéssin
 Tamièla
 Tipoli

References

Departments of Burkina Faso
Gnagna Province